Eiseniona is a genus of annelids belonging to the family Lumbricidae.

Species:

Eiseniona albolineata 
Eiseniona carpetana 
Eiseniona gabriellae 
Eiseniona gerardoi 
Eiseniona gerardoi 
Eiseniona oliveirai 
Eiseniona sineporis

References

Lumbricidae